William Daron Pulliam (October 5, 1946 – June 9, 2013), who performed in the 1970s under the name Darondo, was an American soul singer from the San Francisco Bay Area.

Life and career 
Darondo was born in 1946 in Berkeley, California. As a child, Darondo began enjoying rhythm and blues after his mother purchased him a guitar.

At the beginning of his career, Darondo met jazz pianist Al Turner, who suggested the singer record something in the studio. That suggestion resulted in the single "I Want Your Love So Bad", which got Darondo noticed by Ray Dobard, the owner of record label Music City. Darondo collaborated with Turner on songs at Dobard's studio, releasing three records from 1972 to 1974. One particular single, "Didn't I", ending up selling 35,000 copies and was played extensively on local radio. 

During this period, Darondo got the opportunity to be the opening act for James Brown at Bimbo's 365 Club in the early 1970s. The singer also developed a unique sense of style, dressing in a white fur coat with snakeskin shoes and driving a white Rolls-Royce Silver Cloud with a "DARONDO" vanity plate. It was speculated that Darondo was a pimp, though he denied this claim. According to Darondo, his stage name originated as a compliment from a waitress who was fond of his generous tipping habits. 

Towards the late 1970s, Darondo stepped away from music, partially due to being engaged in a financial dispute with Dobard and Music City. During this time, and lasting into the 1980s, Darondo hosted several shows on local cable television. These programs ranged from Darondo's Penthouse After Dark, to children's show Tapper the Rabbit. However, realizing that he needed time away from other people to stop his self-admitted cocaine dependence, Darondo made the decision to leave for Europe. After spending time in London and Paris, he accepted a job playing guitar on a cruise ship, which enabled him to visit other locales like Trinidad. Darondo eventually made his way back to the San Francisco Bay Area, becoming a physical therapist and a speech pathologist. 

Despite being out of the music industry for decades, Darondo received renewed attention in recent years thanks to London disc jockey Gilles Peterson. Peterson played his 1973 single, "Didn't I" on his BBC Radio 1 program, and included the song on a 2005 compilation album called Gilles Peterson Digs America.

Recordings of Darondo are available from Luv N Haight, an imprint label of Ubiquity Records.

In media 
In 2007, Darondo's song "Didn't I" was covered by Jack Peñate on his Spit at Stars EP and in 2008, featured on an episode of Breaking Bad. "Didn't I" was also featured in the 2010 film Saint John of Las Vegas In 2009, the song "Legs" was featured in an episode of the American version of Life on Mars. In 2010, "Didn't I" was featured in the films Night Catches Us and Jack Goes Boating. It also appeared in the New Element video, Future Nature. In 2013, "Didn't I" was featured on a Late Night Tales compilation mixed by Bonobo. In the same year, "Didn't I" was featured in the third installment of the Spanish Apartment trilogy, Chinese Puzzle starring Romain Duris. It was used as an ending theme in an episode of Lovesick. "Didn't I" was covered by the English electronic music duo HONNE on their 2015 EP "Coastal Love". "Didn't I" was also featured on Episode 1, Season 1 of The Blacklist and Season 1 of HBO's The Deuce. The song was featured in the Hulu show, High Fidelity. In September 2020 "Didn't I" was covered by a female artist, the American soul/blues singer Regina Bonelli. In 2018 producer Harry Fraud sampled “Didn't I” for his single “The Count”. Which also features Wiz Khalifa and Curren$y. Most recently, in September 2021, "Didn't I" closed Episode 4 (Season 1) of the Scottish television drama Guilt, produced by the BBC and airing on Masterpiece Mystery, as well as Episode 10, Season 2 of FXX comedy series Dave (TV series).

Personal life 
In the 1980s, Darondo met his wife, Prem, in Fiji.

Darondo died of heart failure in 2013 at the age of 66.

Discography
 Let My People Go, Ubiquity Records, 2006
 Listen to My Song, the Music City Sessions, Omnivore Recordings, 2011

References

External links
 Darondo at Ubiquity Records
 Let My People Go LP on Ubiquity Records
 NPR SXSW Artists to Watch
 March 2008 interview with L.A. Record
 Live Photos @ Detroit Bar (June 2008)
 Let My People Go on YouTube

1946 births
2013 deaths
American funk singers
American soul singers
Musicians from Berkeley, California
Singers from California